Steffi Graf was the defending champion but was forced to retire in the final losing 6–4 against Jana Novotná.

Seeds
A champion seed is indicated in bold text while text in italics indicates the round in which that seed was eliminated. The top four seeds received a bye to the second round.

  Steffi Graf (final)
  Conchita Martínez (second round)
  Jana Novotná (champion)
  Anke Huber (second round)
  Lindsay Davenport (first round)
  Iva Majoli (second round)
  Mary Joe Fernández (first round)
  Barbara Paulus (quarterfinals)

Draw

Final

Section 1

Section 2

External links
 1996 Advanta Championships of Philadelphia Draw

Advanta Championships of Philadelphia
1996 WTA Tour